"Rocket Man" (officially titled "Rocket Man (I Think It's Going to Be a Long, Long Time)") is a song written by English musician Elton John and songwriter Bernie Taupin, and performed by John. It was originally released on 17 April 1972 in the US, as the lead single to John's album Honky Château. The song first charted in the UK on 22 April, rising to  2 in the UK Singles Chart and No. 6 in the US Billboard Hot 100, becoming a major hit single for John.

On 21 January 2022, the song was certified double platinum by the British Phonographic Industry (BPI) for sales and streams of 1,200,000 digital downloads and streaming equivalent sales. With sales of 3 million in the US the song was certified triple platinum by the Recording Industry Association of America (RIAA). Rolling Stone lists it at No. 149 of its 500 greatest songs of all time.

The song has been covered by many artists, most notably by Kate Bush in 1991 with a reggae-tinged version, and by Portuguese singer David Fonseca in 2007. John himself, alongside producer Pnau and singer Dua Lipa, included the song in his 2021 mashup single "Cold Heart (Pnau remix)". William Shatner's spoken-word version from 1978 has been widely parodied.

Background 
The song was inspired by the short story "The Rocket Man" in The Illustrated Man by Ray Bradbury, and echoes the theme of David Bowie's 1969 song "Space Oddity" (both recordings were produced by Gus Dudgeon). Taupin has denied that the Bowie song was an inspiration, but has acknowledged borrowing from Pearls Before Swine's 1970 "Rocket Man," written by Tom Rapp, which was also influenced by the Bradbury story.   According to an account in Elizabeth Rosenthal's book His Song: The Musical Journey of Elton John, the song was inspired by Taupin's sighting of either a shooting star or a distant aeroplane.

The song describes a Mars-bound astronaut's mixed feelings at leaving Earth to do his job. Rosenthal's account goes on to relate that the notion of astronauts no longer being perceived as heroes, but in fact as an "everyday occupation", led Taupin to the song's opening lines: "She packed my bags last night, pre-flight. Zero hour: 9 a.m. And I'm gonna be high as a kite by then."

Musically, the song is a highly arranged classical rock ballad anchored by piano, with atmospheric texture added by synthesizer (played on the recording by engineer Dave Hentschel) and slide guitar. It is also known for being the first song in John's catalogue to feature what would become the signature backing vocal combination of his band at the time, Dee Murray, Nigel Olsson and Davey Johnstone.

The first stanza of "Rocket Man" was thought of by Bernie Taupin while he was on the motorway heading to his parents' home; he had to "repeat it to himself for two hours," which was "unfortunate", but in later interviews he said that since it gave him a hit, it was all worthwhile.

Legacy 
"Rocket Man" was ranked No. 242 in the 2004 list of Rolling Stone's 500 Greatest Songs of All Time; it was ranked No. 245 in the list's 2010 revision, and 149 in the 2021 revision.
The song has been a staple of John's concerts. Among numerous other performances, John played "Rocket Man" at the launch site of Space Shuttle Discovery in 1998. In tribute to David Bowie after his death in January 2016, John performed a piano rendition that combined "Rocket Man" with Bowie's "Space Oddity".

Music video 
In May 2017, an official music video for "Rocket Man" premiered at the Cannes Film Festival as a winner of Elton John: The Cut, a competition organised in partnership with AKQA, Pulse Films, and YouTube in honour of the fiftieth anniversary of his songwriting relationship with Bernie Taupin. The competition called upon independent filmmakers to submit treatments for music videos for one of three Elton John songs from the 1970s, with each song falling within a specific concept category. "Rocket Man" was designated for the animation category, and was co-directed by Iranian refugee Majid Adin and Irish animation director Stephen McNally; the video was inspired by Adin's own migration to England, portraying a character envisioning himself as an astronaut to draw parallels between the song's lyrics and the experiences of a refugee.

Track listings 
All songs written by Elton John and Bernie Taupin.
 "Rocket Man" – 4:38
 "Suzie (Dramas)" – 3:21

In 2003, Universal Records released both a 12-inch vinyl (promotional only) & CD maxi-single with three new remixes of the song:
 A. "Rocket Man (KDME remix)" – 4:20
 B1. "Rocket Man 03" – 4:01
 B2. "Rocket Man (Royal Garden's Radio mix)" – 4:19

Of these, "Rocket Man 03" was also included on the Rocket/Island/Mercury EP "Remixed," along with four other remixes of Elton recordings.

Personnel
 Elton John – piano, lead vocals
 David Hentschel – ARP synthesizer
 Davey Johnstone – electric slide & acoustic guitars, backing vocals
 Dee Murray – bass guitar, backing vocals
 Nigel Olsson – drums, backing vocals

Charts

Weekly charts

Year-end charts

Certifications

Kate Bush version 

English singer-songwriter Kate Bush released a cover of "Rocket Man" (with the subtitle "I Think It's Going to Be a Long, Long Time") in 1991 as part of the Elton John/Bernie Taupin tribute album Two Rooms: Celebrating the Songs of Elton John & Bernie Taupin. Her reggae-inflected version of "Rocket Man" was a commercial success, reaching No. 12 on the UK Singles Chart and No. 2 in Australia. In 2007, the track won The Observer readers' award for Greatest Cover of all time. The B-side of the single was Bush's recording of another Elton John classic, "Candle in the Wind."

Critical reception 
Upon its release, Ian Gittins of Melody Maker described it as a "real curio" as Bush's "ickle-girl quaver is applied as liberally as Elt's cod space-epic is unexpectedly white-reggaed up behind her". Stephen Dalton of NME was negative in his review, noting Bush's "ill-advised decision" to "croon breathily over an abysmal 'reggae' arrangement".

Track listings 
All songs were written by Elton John and Bernie Taupin.

UK 7-inch and cassette single

UK 12-inch and CD single

Personnel 
All titles:
 Kate Bush – keyboards, vocals, producer
 Del Palmer – engineer

Additional musicians on "Rocket Man":
 Davy Spillane – uilleann pipes
 Del Palmer – bass
 Alistair Anderson – concertina
 Charlie Morgan – drums
 Alan Murphy – guitar

Charts

Weekly charts

Year-end charts

David Fonseca version 

Portuguese singer David Fonseca released his version of the song as a single in Portugal, reaching No. 12 in the Portuguese Top 20. The song, full title "Rocket Man (I Think It's Going To Be A Long, Long Time)", also appears on Fonseca's third album Dreams in Colour released in 2007 and on the Dreams in Colour: Tour Edition released in 2008. The music video was directed by Fonseca himself. Fonseca also regularly performs the single live in his concerts.

Chart performance

William Shatner version 
At the 5th Saturn Awards Ceremony, which aired as the "Science Fiction Film Awards" in January 1978, Taupin introduced William Shatner's spoken word interpretation of the song. It used chroma key video techniques to simultaneously portray three different images of Shatner, representing the different facets of the Rocket Man's character.

The performance gained notoriety as the most well-known example of Shatner's interpretive spoken word cover versions, and has often been used for mockery or as an unintentionally funny novelty. It was parodied on the U.S. animated series Animaniacs, Family Guy, Freakazoid!, Futurama, The Simpsons, the Canadian CGI series ReBoot, and in the video for "Where It's At" by Beck. On a 1992 episode of Late Night with David Letterman, Chris Elliott parodied Shatner's performance, complete with chroma key effects.

Shatner re-recorded the song for his 2011 album, Seeking Major Tom. In his book What Were They Thinking? The 100 Dumbest Events in Television History, author David Hofstede ranked Shatner's performance at No. 17 on the list.

Sampling
Elton John and Dua Lipa's 2021 collaborative song "Cold Heart" samples "Rocket Man" for its chorus, along with snippets of other Elton John songs. It topped the charts in the United Kingdom, Australia and New Zealand, reached No. 2 in Ireland, and peaked at No. 7 on the US Billboard Hot 100.

References 

1970s ballads
1972 singles
1972 songs
1980 singles
1991 singles
1992 singles
Animated music videos
David Fonseca songs
DJM Records singles
Elton John songs
Kate Bush songs
Mercury Records singles
Rock ballads
Song recordings produced by Gus Dudgeon
Songs about spaceflight
Songs with lyrics by Bernie Taupin
Songs with music by Elton John
Uni Records singles
Universal Records singles